Epepeotes basigranatus is a species of beetle in the family Cerambycidae. It was described by Léon Fairmaire in 1883.

References

basigranatus
Beetles described in 1883